Brickell on the River is a complex of residential towers in Downtown Miami, Florida, United States. The complex consists of a 42-story North Tower, which was completed in 2005, a 46-story South Tower built in 2007, and a central plaza between both towers, containing a restaurant, riverfront promenade, and complex amenities. The North Tower took 31 months to build, as construction began in December 2003, and was completed in July 2006. Construction began in 2004, and opened in December 2007.

The complex is located on the southern banks of the Miami River in Downtown Miami. The address is 31 SE 5th Street for the North Tower and 41 SE 5th Street for the South Tower. The Fifth Street Metromover Station, a station in Miami's mass transit system, is located immediately adjacent to the North Tower.

See also
List of tallest buildings in Miami

References
http://skyscrapercenter.com/building/brickell-on-the-river-south-tower/4593
http://skyscrapercenter.com/building/brickell-on-the-river-north-tower/4133

Residential buildings completed in 2006
Residential buildings completed in 2007
Residential skyscrapers in Miami
2005 establishments in Florida